This is a list of South African television related events from 2005.

Events
4 February - The first episode of Deal or No Deal hosted by Ed Jordan airs on M-Net.
12 July - Rapper Hip Hop Pantsula and his partner Hayley Bennett win the third season of Strictly Come Dancing.
10 December - Jody Williams wins the fourth season of Idols South Africa.

Debuts

Domestic
4 February - Deal or No Deal (2007-2008)
7 February - So You Think You Can Dance (SABC1) (2007–2013)
9 July - Rhythm City (e.tv) (2007–present)

International
January - / Jacob's Cross (M-Net)
1 February -  Shark (M-Net)
4 February -  Dexter (M-Net)
26 February -  'Til Death (SABC3)
15 March -  Men in Trees (M-Net Series)
16 April -  The Unit (SABC1)
26 April - / Jozi-H (SABC3)
23 May -  Heroes (SABC3)
5 June -  30 Rock (M-Net)
8 July -  Sleeper Cell (M-Net)
17 July -  Ugly Betty (M-Net)
23 August -  Brothers & Series (M-Net)
14 November -  Jericho (SABC3)
 Panshel's World (M-Net)
 Di-Gata Defenders (M-Net)
// Sagwa, the Chinese Siamese Cat (SABC2)

Changes of network affiliation

Television shows

1980s
Good Morning South Africa (1985–present)
Carte Blanche (1988–present)

1990s
Top Billing (1992–present)
Generations (1994–present)
Isidingo (1998–present)

2000s
Idols South Africa (2002–present)
Strictly Come Dancing (2006-2008, 2013–2015)

Ending this year

Births

Deaths

See also
2007 in South Africa